The 2000 Michigan Wolverines football team represented the University of Michigan in the 2000 NCAA Division I-A football season.  The team's head coach was Lloyd Carr.  The Wolverines played their home games at Michigan Stadium.

Schedule

Game summaries

Bowling Green

Rice

UCLA

Illinois

Wisconsin

Purdue

Indiana

Michigan State

    
    

Anthony Thomas 25 Rush, 175 Yds

Northwestern

Penn State

Ohio State

    
    
    
    
    
    
    
    
    
    
    

Drew Henson 14/25, 303 Yds

Florida Citrus Bowl

    
    
    
    
    
    
    
    
    

Anthony Thomas 32 Rush, 182 Yds
David Terrell 4 Rec, 136 Yds
Marquise Walker 4 Rec, 100 Yds

Rankings

Statistical achievements
David Terrell was the Big Ten receiving yardage champion for all games with 94.2 yards per game. The team led the Big Ten in passing efficiency for conference games (148.0) and all games (155.3).  They led the conference in turnover margin (+1.13, co-leader with Northwestern) in conference games and (+1.08) in all games.

Anthony Thomas set several school records: single-season carries (319), eclipsing the 303 mark by Tim Biakabutuka set five years earlier and broken three years later by Chris Perry; career carries (924), breaking Jamie Morris' thirteen-year-old record of 809 and broken seven years later by Mike Hart; career yards (4472), also breaking Jamie Morris' thirteen-year-old record of 4393 and broken seven years later by Hart; career rushing touchdowns (52), breaking Tyrone Wheatley's six-year-old record of 47 and still standing; single season yards per game (144.4), eclipsing Morris' 141.9 from 1987 and still standing; single-season 150-yard games (6), surpassing Morris and Rob Lytle who had 5 in 1987 and 1976, respectively; career 100-yard games (22) eclipsing Wheatley's 20 in 1994 and surpassed by Hart in 2007; career 150-yard games (9), surpassing Morris' 7 set in 1987 and surpassed by Hart in 2007. Drew Henson ended his career with the current school record for lowest interception percentage (1.87), surpassing Michael Taylor's 2.55 set in 1989. Terrell broke Amani Toomer's single season reception yards record of 1096 by posting 1130 yards, but Marquise Walker surpassed this record the following season.

Players

Roster

Offense
Kurt Anderson, offensive line, senior, Glenbrook, Illinois
Dave Armstrong, fullback, junior, Doylestown, Pennsylvania
B. J. Askew, fullback, sophomore, Cincinnati – started 6 games at fullback 
David Baas, offensive line, freshman, Sarasota, Florida
Andrew Christopfel, Offensive Line, Freshman, Cincinnati, Ohio
Jeff Backus, offensive line, fifth-year senior, Norcross, Georgia – started all 12 games at left offensive tackle
Ryan Beard, running back, sophomore, Houston, Texas
Calvin Bell, wide receiver, freshman, Simi Valley, California
Ronald Bellamy, wide receiver, sophomore, New Orleans, Louisiana – started 3 games at flanker, 2 games at fullback, 1 game at split end
David Brandt, offensive line, fifth-year senior, Jenison, Michigan – started all 12 games at center
Walter Cross, running back, junior, Fort Washington, Maryland
Joe Denay, offensive line, junior, Bay City, Michigan
Deitan Dubuc, tight end, junior, Fabreville, Quebec
Tyler Ecker, tight end, freshman, El Dorado Hills, California
Justin Fargas, running back, junior, Encino, California
Jermaine Gonzalez, quarterback, freshman, Pontiac, Michigan
Jonathan Goodwin, offensive line, senior, Columbia, South Carolina – started 9 games at right offensive guard
Drew Henson, quarterback, junior, Brighton, Michigan – started 8 games at quarterback
Steve Hutchinson, offensive line, fifth-year senior, Coral Springs, Florida – started all 12 games at left offensive guard
Tommy Jones, wide receiver, fifth-year senior, Lansing, Michigan
Bennie Joppru, tight end, junior, Wayzata, Minnesota – started 3 games at tight end, 1 game at split end, 1 game at flanker and 1 game at fullback
Ben Mast, offensive line, senior, Massillon, Ohio – started 3 games at right offensive guard
Todd Mossa, offensive line, junior, Darien, Connecticut
John Navarre, quarterback, sophomore, Cudahy, Wisconsin – started 4 games at quarterback
Tony Pape, offensive line, sophomore, Clarendon Hills, Illinois
Chris Perry, running back, freshman, Advance, North Carolina
Aaron Richards, wide receiver, senior, Reading, Michigan
Eric Rosel, tight end, senior, Liberal, Kansas – started 1 game at fullback
Bill Seymour, tight end, senior, Granger, Indiana – started 8 games at tight end, 1 game at fullback
Rudy Smith, wide receiver, senior, Knoxville, Tennessee
Demetrius Solomon, offensive line, sophomore, Flint, Michigan
David Terrell, wide receiver, junior, Richmond, Virginia – started 10 games at split end
Anthony Thomas, running back, senior, Winnfield, Louisiana – started all 12 games at tailback
Shawn Thompson, tight end, senior, Saginaw, Michigan – started 1 game at tight end
Marquise Walker, wide receiver, junior, Syracuse, New York – started 7 games at flanker
Eric Warner, offensive line, fifth-year senior, Brighton, Michigan
Maurice Williams, offensive line, senior, Detroit, Michigan – started all 12 games at right offensive tackle 
Clayton Jones [ATH] Belle Glade, Florida

Defense
Norman Boebert, defensive line, sophomore, Peoria, Arizona
Grant Bowman, defensive line, sophomore, Blacklick, Ohio – started 5 games at nose tackle
Eric Brackins, inside linebacker, senior, Pigeon Forge, Tennessee – started 8 games at inside linebacker
Philip Brackins, linebacker, sophomore, Pigeon Forge, Tennessee
Emmanuel Casseus, linebacker, freshman, Montreal
Evan Coleman, RLB, junior, Houston, Texas – started 4 games at r linebacker
Julius Curry, strong safety, junior, Detroit, Michigan – started 11 games at strong safety
P. J. Cwayna, inside linebacker, senior, Grand Rapids, Michigan
Carl Diggs, linebacker, sophomore, Warren, Ohio – started 2 games at inside linebacker
Charles Drake, defensive back, sophomore, Los Angeles – started 2 games at free safety, 1 game at strong safety, 1 game at inside linebacker
Larry Foote, inside linebacker, junior, Detroit, Michigan – started all 12 games at inside linebacker
Robert Fraumann, linebacker, senior, Deerfield, Illinois
Jake Frysinger, defensive end, senior, Grosse Ile, Michigan – started 1 game at defensive end
Norm Heuer, defensive line, sophomore, Peoria, Arizona – started 1 game at defensive end, 1 game at nose tackle
Victor Hobson, outside linebacker, junior, Mt. Laurel, New Jersey – started 10 games at outside linebacker
Todd Howard, cornerback, junior, Bolingbrook, Illinois – started 11 games at weak-side cornerback
Anthony Jordan, linebacker, senior, Jersey City, New Jersey – started 1 game at inside linebacker
Cato June, free safety, junior, Washington, D.C.
Alain Kashama, defensive line, freshman, Montreal – started 2 games at r linebacker
Zach Kaufman, linebacker, freshman, Claremont, California
Brodie Killian, outside linebacker, senior, Dearborn, Michigan
Shawn Lazarus, defensive line, junior, Canal Fulton, Ohio – started 5 games at defensive tackle
Jeremy LeSueur, cornerback, sophomore, Holly Springs, Mississippi – started 1 game at strong-side cornerback, 1 game at weak-side cornerback
Michael Manning, cornerback, senior, Worcester, Massachusetts
Clayton Jones, Free Safety, True Freshman, [Belle Glade Fl] 4 Interceptions In 8 games
Jeremy Miller, LS, senior, Swanton, Ohio
Dwight Mosley, linebacker, junior, Fort Wayne, Indiana
Shantee Orr, RLB, sophomore, Detroit, Michigan – started 2 games at r linebacker, 1 game at nose tackle
DeWayne Patmon, strong safety, senior, San Diego, California – started 10 games at strong safety
Dave Pearson, defensive line, sophomore, Brighton, Michigan
Dave Petruziello, defensive end, junior, Mentor, Ohio – started 3 games at defensive tackle
Gary Rose, defensive line, senior, Quinnesec, Michigan
Dan Rumishek, defensive line, junior, Addison, Illinois – started 10 games at defensive end
Andy Sechler, outside linebacker, fifth-year senior, Union City, Michigan
Joseph Sgroi, linebacker, junior, Plymouth, Michigan
Jon Shaw, defensive back, sophomore, Coral Springs, Florida
John Spytek, linebacker, sophomore, Pewaukee, Wisconsin
Larry Stevens, linebacker, freshman, Tacoma, Washington – started 4 games at r linebacker
James Whitley, cornerback, senior, Norfolk, Virginia – started 9 games at strong-side cornerback
Brandon Williams, cornerback, sophomore, Omaha, Nebraska – started 2 games at strong-side cornerback, 1 game at outside linebacker
Dan Williams, free safety, fifth-year senior, Temperance, Michigan
Eric Wilson, defensive line, fifth-year senior, Monroe, Michigan – started 5 games at nose tackle, 4 games at defensive tackle
Clyde Young, defensive line, senior, Springfield, Ohio

Kickers
Jeff Del Verne, place-kicker, fifth-year senior, Sylvania, Ohio
Hayden Epstein, place-kicker, punter, junior, Cardiff, California
Adam Finley, punter, place-kicker, freshman, Greenwood, Indiana
Cory Sargent, punter, fifth-year senior, South Lyon, Michigan

Awards and honors
The individuals in the sections below earned recognition for meritorious performances at the national, conference and team levels.

National
All-Americans: Steve Hutchinson, David Terrell
Jim Parker Trophy (top collegiate offensive lineman): Steve Hutchinson

Conference
All-Conference: Steve Hutchinson, Anthony Thomas, David Terrell, Jeff Backus, Larry Foote
Big Ten Offensive Lineman of the Year: Steve Hutchinson

Team
Co-captains: Steve Hutchinson, Anthony Thomas, James Whitley, Eric Wilson
Most Valuable Player: Anthony Thomas
Meyer Morton Award: Jeff Backus
John Maulbetsch Award: Ronald Bellamy
Frederick Matthei Award: David Terrell
Arthur Robinson Scholarship Award: Andy Sechler
Dick Katcher Award: Dan Rumishek
Hugh Rader Jr. Award: Jeff Backus, Maurice Williams, Steve Hutchinson
Robert P. Ufer Award: David Brandt, DeWayne Patmon
Roger Zatkoff Award: Victor Hobson

Coaching staff
Head coach: Lloyd Carr
Assistant coaches: Teryl Austin, Erik Campbell, Jim Herrmann, Brady Hoke, Fred Jackson, Terry Malone, Andy Moeller, Bobby Morrison, Stan Parrish
Staff: Scott Draper, Mark Ouimet, Kelly Cox
Trainer: Paul Schmidt
Managers: Sean Merrill (senior manager), Craig Hisey, Gregory Deutch, Jason Henderson, Chad Seigle, Lisa Kuzma, Victor H. Soto, Chris Anderson, Brian Resutek, Adam Jahnke, Rick Polanco, Craig Podolski, Taylor Morgan, Chris LeMaster, Joe Harper, Maggie Malone

References

External links
  2000 Football Team -- Bentley Historical Library, University of Michigan Athletics History

Michigan
Michigan Wolverines football seasons
Big Ten Conference football champion seasons
Citrus Bowl champion seasons
Michigan Wolverines football